Thomas Wilfred "Smokey, Fred" Harris (October 11, 1890 – June 4, 1974) was a Canadian professional ice hockey player. Harris played in the Pacific Coast Hockey Association (PCHA), the National Hockey League (NHL) and the Western Canada Hockey League (WCHL). Harris was born in Port Arthur, Ontario. His brother Henry was also a professional ice hockey player. Harris scored the first goal in Boston Bruins' franchise history.

Hockey career 
Harris first played senior hockey with the Kenora Thistles in the 1909–10 season. In 1911, he joined the Vancouver Millionaires of the PCHA, playing three seasons before being traded to the Portland Rosebuds before the 1914–15 season. He played four seasons for Portland but abandoned the team after the final season (1917–18) to join the army.

Portland won the PCHA championship in 1916, briefly taking over the Stanley Cup before losing it in the 1916 Stanley Cup Finals to the Montreal Canadiens. After Portland folded, Harris returned to the Millionaires, playing another five seasons. With Vancouver, Harris played in the 1921 and 1923 Stanley Cup series, both times against the Ottawa Senators.

After one season with the Seattle Metropolitans, he was traded to the Boston Bruins of the NHL, scoring the Bruins' first-ever NHL goal on December 1, 1924 in the team's NHL debut game against the other NHL expansion team that year, the Montreal Maroons. Harris's second-period goal tied the game 1-1. Boston prevailed 2-1. Harris played six games for the Bruins before being traded again, to the Vancouver Maroons of the WCHL, the renamed Millionaires franchise.

After one season with Vancouver, Harris moved to California where, except for 1926–27 where he played for the Edmonton Eskimos of the Prairie League, he played out his career for teams in Los Angeles and San Francisco in the California Pro League. His final season was 1931–32 for the San Francisco Rangers. He was briefly playing coach for the Los Angeles Richfield Oil in 1925–26, and coached a full season for the Hollywood Millionaires in 1929–30.

Playing style
Fred Harris played primarily as a left winger, where he would make good use of his speed skating down the rink side. Vancouver Daily World prior to the 1921–22 PCHA season described Harris' rushes along the boards in "famous 'fly-on-the-wall'" terms. He was not only a capable goalscorer but also a strong set-up man, which he showed during the 1920–21 PCHA season where his 17 assists led the league and helped him to a shared first place in the overall scoring race (32 points) with Frank Fredrickson of the Victoria Aristocrats. He also co-led (with Art Duncan) the PCHA in assists during the 1923–24 PCHA season with 10 helpers.

Harris also played occasionally as a rover, an archaic position between the offensive defenceman and the centre forward position, where he would display more defensive responsibilities. A match report in the Vancouver Daily World from the 1919–20 PCHA season, covering a game between the Vancouver Millionaires and the Seattle Metropolitans, described Harris' use of the hook-check in breaking up Seattle attacks with the characteristic sweeping motion of the stick along the ice.

Career statistics

Regular season and playoffs

Awards
 PCHA First All-Star Team – 1913, 1916, 1920 	  	
 PCHA Second All-Star Team – 1922

Transactions
 January 1, 1914 – Traded to Portland (PCHA) by Vancouver (PCHA) for Ken Mallen 	  	
 November 29, 1918 – Transferred to Vancouver (PCHA) after Portland (PCHA) franchise folded 	  	
 October 30, 1923 – Traded to Seattle (PCHA) by Vancouver (PCHA) for cash 	  	
 November 2, 1924 – Traded to Boston (NHL) by Seattle (PCHA) for cash 	  	
 December 21, 1924 – Traded to Vancouver (WCHL) by Boston for cash 	  	
 December 3, 1926  – Signed as a free agent by Edmonton (PrHL) 	  	
 October 17, 1927 – Signed as a free agent by LA Richfield (Cal-Pro)

References

External links

1890 births
1974 deaths
Boston Bruins players
Canadian ice hockey left wingers
Ice hockey people from Ontario
Kenora Thistles players
Portland Rosebuds players
Seattle Metropolitans players
Sportspeople from Thunder Bay
Vancouver Maroons players
Vancouver Millionaires players